Anne Consigny (born 25 May 1963) is a French actress who has been active since 1981. She received a César Award nomination for Best Actress for her role in the film Not Here to Be Loved (2005). She is also known for her role as Claude in the 2007 drama The Diving Bell and the Butterfly and as Elizabeth in the 2008 film A Christmas Tale, for which she was nominated for the César Award for Best Supporting Actress.

Personal life 
She is the daughter of Pierre Consigny, who was the head of cabinet for the Prime Minister Maurice Couve de Murville. She has five siblings. One of her brothers is the writer and publicist Thierry Consigny, author of La Mort de Lara.

She has two sons with French film director and former partner Benoît Jacquot; Vladimir Consigny, an actor, and Louis, born in 1994. She is married to art critic Éric de Chassey.

Filmography

References

External links 

 
 
 
 

1963 births
Living people
People from Alençon
French film actresses
Troupe of the Comédie-Française
French stage actresses
20th-century French actresses
21st-century French actresses
French National Academy of Dramatic Arts alumni
Cours Florent alumni
Actors from Normandy